Bogdan Dinu is a Romanian professional boxer in the heavyweight division.

Biography
Dinu is also an Independent Special Actions and Intervention Service (SIIAS) agent.

Professional career
He turned pro in 2008.

On 13 December 2013, Dinu won the third season edition of Bigger's Better, a boxing tournament under a familiar format of the popular UK Prizefighter series, with all the fights scheduled for three-minute rounds. He rocked through his first tournament in Greece, until to repeat the trick later in the same year in the super final from Portugal.

On 17 November, 2018, Dinu faced title contender Jarrell Miller, who was ranked #2 by the WBA and #4 by the WBO. Dinu started the fight well, boxing behind his jab. His start was overshadowed by the powerful Miller, who started to apply more pressure in the fourth round, and drop Dinu twice, who couldn't bet the count the second time. Eventually, Miller tested positive for GW501516 prior his next fight against Anthony Joshua, causing the New York State Athletic Commission (NYSAC) to deny him a license to box. Further tests proved positive for EPO and HGH.

In his following fight, Dinu faced another title contender in Kubrat Pulev. Pulev was ranked #1 by the IBF and #9 by the WBC. The fight started off slow, as Pulev picked up the pace in round two. In the fourth round, Dinu connected on a couple of overhand rights, which caused a severe cut over Pulev's left eye. Pulev was cleared to continue the fight. By round seven, Pulev had regained his confidence, and managed to drop Dinu three times in the round. Dinu managed to get up from the first two, but after the third knockdown in a row, the referee decided to stop the fight. 

On 14 December 2019, Dinu bounced back with a fourth round TKO win against Osborn Machimana. 

On 3 October 2020, Dinu beat Frank Bluemle via second round TKO.

On 5 June 2021, Dinu challenged for the vacant WBA interim heavyweight title, but was unsuccessful, losing to Daniel Dubois by second-round knockout in Telford, England.

Professional boxing record

Bigger's Better record 

|-
|align="center" colspan=8|6 Wins (3 knockouts, 3 decisions), 0 Losses, 0 Draws
|-
|align=center style="border-style: none none solid solid; background: #e3e3e3"|Res.
|align=center style="border-style: none none solid solid; background: #e3e3e3"|Record
|align=center style="border-style: none none solid solid; background: #e3e3e3"|Opponent
|align=center style="border-style: none none solid solid; background: #e3e3e3"|Type
|align=center style="border-style: none none solid solid; background: #e3e3e3"|Rd., Time
|align=center style="border-style: none none solid solid; background: #e3e3e3"|Date
|align=center style="border-style: none none solid solid; background: #e3e3e3"|Location
|align=center style="border-style: none none solid solid; background: #e3e3e3"|Notes
|-align=center
|Win
|6-0
| align=left| Lucian Bot 
| UD || 3 
|2013-12-13 || align=left| Estádio da Luz, Lisbon, Portugal
|align=left|
|-align=center
|Win
|5-0
|align=left| Fabrice Aurieng
| UD || 3 
|2013-12-13 || align=left| Estádio da Luz, Lisbon, Portugal
|align=left|
|-align=center
|Win
|4-0
|align=left| Sergej Maslobojev
| TKO || 3 
|2013-12-13 || align=left| Estádio da Luz, Lisbon, Portugal
|align=left|
|-align=center
|Win  
|3-0  
|align=left| Edmond Baltatzis
| KO || 1   
| 2013-07-05 || align=left| Sithonia, Greece
|align=left|
|-align=center
|Win  
|2-0  
|align=left| Vladimir Toktasynov
| TKO || 1   
| 2013-07-05 || align=left| Sithonia, Greece
|align=left|
|-align=center
|Win  
|1-0  
|align=left| Dmitri Bezus
| UD || 3   
| 2013-07-05 || align=left| Sithonia, Greece
|align=left|
|-align=center
|-

Titles
2013 Bigger's Better champion.

References

External links

2003 Cadet World Amateur Boxing Championships
2002 Cadet World Amateur Boxing Championships
2003 Cadet European Amateur Boxing Championships
2004 Junior World Amateur Boxing Championships 
2004 Romanian National Championships
2005 Junior European Amateur Boxing Championships
Bogdan Dinu - Profile, News Archive & Current Rankings at Box.Live

Heavyweight boxers
Living people
Date of birth missing (living people)
Year of birth missing (living people)
People from Buzău
Romanian male boxers